Louis Dominique Girard (1815- Paris, 1871) was a French hydraulic engineer.

A friend and colleague of Léon Foucault, Girard was most notable for his work with impulse turbines. His 1856 design greatly improved on the Jonval turbines that were then common, although it was in turn supplanted by the Pelton wheel in the latter portion of the 19th century.

References

External links 
 La turbine Girard radiale
 Le chemin de fer de Girard

French engineers
Hydraulic engineers
1815 births
1871 deaths